Molla Kheyl-e Purva (also Romanized as Mollā Kheyl-e Pūrvā; also known as Mollā Kheyl and Mollā Khīl) is a village in Zarem Rud Rural District, Hezarjarib District, Neka County, Mazandaran Province, Iran. At the 2006 census, its population was 610, in 148 families.

References 

Populated places in Neka County